Harry Chapin Tribute is a CD of a tribute concert held at the Carnegie Hall in 1987 to commemorate Harry Chapin's 45th birthday if he were alive, and also to award him the Congressional Gold Medal which was presented to his son Joshua Chapin and laid to rest on an empty stool with Harry's guitar leaning against it. Various artists contributed, including Bruce Springsteen, Richie Havens, and Pat Benatar, whom Harry taught to sing rock & roll. It was hosted by Harry Belafonte.

Track listing

References

Harry Chapin tribute albums
1990 live albums
Albums recorded at Carnegie Hall
1987 in New York City
Tribute concerts in the United States